Kharv (also known as Kharv-e Bala, also Romanized as Kharv-e Bālā and Khary-e Bālā; also Kharv-e ‘Olyā) is a city in Central District, in Zeberkhan County, Razavi Khorasan Province, Iran. At the 2006 census, its population was 11,931, in 3,181 families.

References 

Populated places in Nishapur County
Cities in Razavi Khorasan Province